Veronica Rueckert is an American writer, voice consultant, and radio host.

Her writings include the book, Outspoken: Why Women's Voices Get Silenced and How to Set Them Free; previously, she co-hosted Central Time on Wisconsin Public Radio and produced for the award-winning, nationally syndicated radio program, To the Best of Our Knowledge.

Early life and education
Rueckert has stated that while growing up in small towns in Wisconsin, at times she stood out for being Hispanic (she is half Mexican). She attended college at the University of Wisconsin-Madison, where she trained as an opera singer and received a degree in vocal performance.

Career
In 1996, Rueckert began working at Wisconsin Public Radio as a weekend announcer. Eventually, she moved on to produce for the network's Peabody award winning, nationally syndicated To the Best of Our Knowledge (on which her essays were also featured) and to host her own program. During this time, Rueckert also recorded essays for National Public Radio's Day to Day. In 2013, she launched Wisconsin Public Radio's afternoon drive-time program, Central Time, as a host.

Rueckert launched a voice coaching and consulting business in 2015, with a special emphasis on helping women find their voices. The consulting work helped inspire Outspoken, her first book, published by HarperCollins in 2019. Of Outspoken, Kirkus Reviews said, "In a sea of self-help books for women, this one stands out both for its unique perspective and its concrete recommendations," while lauding Rueckert's "encouraging, supportive, and cheerful" literary voice.

Following the publication of Outspoken, Rueckert began authoring articles on women's voices and empowerment in publications including the Washington Post.

References

External links

Living people
Year of birth missing (living people)
Writers from Wisconsin
American radio hosts
Voice coaches